The 2013 ISAF Women's Match World Championship was held in Busan, South Korea between June 4 and June 9, 2013.

Participants

Results

Round Robins

Quarter-finals

Semi-finals

Placement matches (5–8)

Petit final

Final

References

External links
Official Website
Championship website as sailing.org  
Results

World championships
Sailing world championships
Women's Match Racing World Championship
Sailing competitions in South Korea
Sport in Busan
2013 in women's sailing